AFCYBER may refer to:

 Air Force Cyber Command (Provisional)
 Air Forces Cyber, the alignment of Twenty-Fourth Air Force, the current United States Air Force component of United States Cyber Command